Maruthi Dasari, known mononymously as Maruthi, is an Indian director, screenwriter, producer who works primarily in Telugu cinema. He is known for directing low budget films like Ee Rojullo and Bus Stop. Maruthi is associated with Maruthi Talkies, a film production house in the Telugu film industry.

Personal life
Maruthi was born in Machilipatnam, Andhra Pradesh. He completed his education in Machilipatnam. Later Maruthi moved to Hyderabad after his graduation. He learnt animation and later joined DQ Entertainment International, where he was part of the first batch of animators in the city.

Career
Maruthi started his career as a co-producer for the film Premisthe, A Film by Aravind. Later he entered into field of distribution and distributed several films. Then he started designing Ads & designs. At the time Chiranjeevi heard about him and asked him to design a flag for the Praja Rajyam Party and also other promotional ads for the party. He has also gave a logo for Athadu. In 2011, Ram Gopal Varma made Dongala Mutha with 5D camera in a cheaper budget which was attracted by maruthi. He then decided to start a low Budget film and worked on the script. In 2012, with in a short span, Ee Rojullo was released marking the debut of Maruthi. Upon its release, Ee Rojullo mostly gained positive response from the critics. Made on a budget of 50lakhs, it had collected more than 10crores. The movie was one of the most successful Tollywood films in 2012. Later, in November 2012 his second Directorial Venture Bus Stop was released and declared as a Hit.

In 2013, Maruthi wrote and produced Prema Katha Chitram under Maruthi Talkies introducing his camera man J.Prabhakar Reddy as director. Prema Katha Chitram was a sudden hit by collecting a gross of 20 crores. He produced several films like Prema Katha Chitram, Romance, Mahesh, Villa-2, Love You Bangaram, Green Signal. His next film as Director is Kotha Janta starring Allu Sirish in lead role. His next venture with Venkatesh has been announced and titled as Babu Bangaram.Regular shoot of this project starts in February 2016. He did as a writer, screenplay for Bhadram Be Careful Brotheru which was critical success. His next Telugu project with Nani named Bhale Bhale Magadivoy was released and declared a super hit with Nani's brilliant acting.

In 2014, he announced a project titled Radha starring Venkatesh and Nayantara. Consequently, a writer alleged that Maruthi copied his story and filed a case at the writers' association. Though Maruthi denied copying the story, the film was later shelved.

Filmography

Cameo appearances 
 Love You Bangaram (2014)
 Legend (2014)
 Pakka Commercial (2022)

Awards and nominations

References

External links 
 

Living people
21st-century Indian film directors
Telugu film directors
1981 births
People from Machilipatnam
People from Krishna district
Telugu film producers
Film directors from Andhra Pradesh
Film producers from Andhra Pradesh
Screenwriters from Andhra Pradesh
Indian film producers
South Indian International Movie Awards winners